The 2020–21 season was Liverpool Football Club's 129th season in existence and their 59th consecutive season in the top flight of English football. In addition to the domestic league, Liverpool participated in this season's editions of the FA Cup, the EFL Cup, the FA Community Shield and the UEFA Champions League. The season covered the period from August 2020 to 30 June 2021.

The season was notably difficult, as the majority of games were played behind closed doors due to the COVID-19 pandemic, and all three of the club's senior central defenders sustained long-term injuries. The team's early form was creditable and, on 22 November 2020, they broke the club record for longest unbeaten run at home in the league (which had previously stood at 63) with a 3–0 win over Leicester City. However, the run ended on 21 January 2021 following a 1–0 defeat to Burnley; it had stood at 68, the second-longest unbeaten home run in English top-flight history, behind Chelsea's run of 86 games between March 2004 and October 2008. A tough period followed as Liverpool suffered a run of six consecutive defeats at Anfield. The team, however, was fortunately able to reverse their fortunes, winning eight of their final ten league games, which included goalkeeper Alisson scoring a stoppage-time winner against West Bromwich Albion (the first goal ever scored by a Liverpool goalkeeper in the 129-year history of the club), and thus finished third, qualifying for next season's UEFA Champions League.

First-team squad
As of 23 May 2021

New contracts

Transfers

Transfers in

Loan in

Transfers out

Loans out

Transfer summary

Spending

Summer:  £ 73,750,000

Winter:  £ 1,500,000

Total:  £ 75,250,000

Income

Summer:  £ 44,350,000

Winter:  £ 500,000

Total:  £ 44,850,000

Net Expenditure

Summer:  £ 29,400,000

Winter:  £ 1,000,000

Total:  £ 30,400,000

Pre-season friendlies
On 19 August 2020, Liverpool announced that they would play two friendlies as part of their pre-season training camp in Austria. On 2 September 2020, they announced that they would complete their pre-season campaign with a home game against Blackpool.

Competitions

Overview

Premier League

League table

Results summary

Results by matchday

Matches
The league fixtures were announced on 20 August 2020.

FA Cup

Liverpool entered the competition in the third round. The draw was confirmed on 30 November 2020 live on BT Sport. The draw for the fourth and fifth round were made on 11 January 2021, conducted by former Liverpool player Peter Crouch.

EFL Cup

Liverpool entered the competition in the third round. The draw was confirmed on 6 September 2020 live on Sky Sports. The fourth round draw was conducted on 17 September 2020, also live on Sky Sports.

FA Community Shield

UEFA Champions League

Liverpool entered the competition in the group stage.

Group stage

The draw for the group stage was held on 1 October 2020.

Knockout phase

Round of 16
The draw for the round of 16 was held on 14 December 2020.

Quarter-finals
The draw for the quarter-finals was held on 19 March 2021.

Squad statistics

Appearances
Players with no appearances are not included on the list.

Goals

Assists
Not all goals have an assist.

Clean sheets

Disciplinary record

Club awards

End-of-season awards

Standard Chartered Men's Player of the Season: Mohamed Salah
Goal of the Season: Alisson (vs. West Brom, 16 May 2021)

Liverpool Standard Chartered Player of the Month award

Awarded monthly to the player that was chosen by fans voting on Liverpoolfc.com

References

External links

Liverpool F.C. seasons
Liverpool F.C.
Liverpool F.C.